Mohammad Aslam Mohammad Nawfer (born 27 July 1990) is a Sri Lankan cricketer who now plays for Kuwait national cricket team. He made his first-class debut for Saracens Sports Club in the 2010–11 Premier Trophy on 25 March 2011.

He made his Twenty20 International (T20I) debut for Kuwait against Qatar on 4 July 2019. In March 2021, he retained the captaincy of the Kuwait cricket team. In October 2021, he was named as the captain of Kuwait's squad for the Group A matches in the 2021 ICC Men's T20 World Cup Asia Qualifier.

References

External links
 

1990 births
Living people
Kuwaiti cricketers
Kuwait Twenty20 International cricketers
Sri Lankan cricketers
Saracens Sports Club cricketers
Cricketers from Colombo
Sri Lankan emigrants to Kuwait
Sri Lankan expatriate sportspeople in Kuwait